The England national cricket team toured South Africa in the 1948-49 season. The tour was organised by the Marylebone Cricket Club and the side played five Test matches as England and 16 other first-class matches as "MCC". Two of the first-class matches took place in Rhodesia (now Zimbabwe). There were also two non-first-class matches.

England won the first and last Test matches; the other three were drawn. Though the margin of victory in both the England wins was small, Wisden was in no doubt that the better team had won: "Much less than justice would have been done if England had not won the rubber," it said. "In all five Tests clearly they were the superior team".

England team
The MCC team was captained by George Mann, with Billy Griffith as vice-captain. The Worcestershire secretary Brigadier Michael Green was the tour manager.

The full team was: 
George Mann; Billy Griffith (wicketkeeper); Alec Bedser; Denis Compton; Jack Crapp; Godfrey Evans (wicketkeeper); Cliff Gladwin; Len Hutton; Roly Jenkins; Charles Palmer; Reg Simpson; Maurice Tremlett; Cyril Washbrook; Allan Watkins; Doug Wright; Jack Young

Test series summary

First Test

Second Test

Third Test

Fourth Test

Fifth Test

References

External links

1948 in English cricket
1949 in English cricket
1948 in South African cricket
1949 in South African cricket
International cricket competitions from 1945–46 to 1960
1948-49
South African cricket seasons from 1945–46 to 1969–70